Fresh Pond is a small unincorporated community in El Dorado County, California. The ZIP code is 95726. The community is inside area code 530.
It is nestled along Highway 50 and offers a convenient gas station by the road.

Climate

The average annual snowfall lies around 6 inches and average rainfall of 51 inches (approximate), normal for the west slope of the Sierra Nevadas.  High temperatures in summer are about 90 degrees, dropping to about 54 in the winter.  This mildly wet climate and higher elevation allows much vegetation to thrive in this area.

References

Unincorporated communities in California
Unincorporated communities in El Dorado County, California